The Instituto Irlandés Hermosillo is a private school in Hermosillo, Sonora. It serves preschool through bachillerato (senior high school).

References

External links
 Instituto Irlandés Hermosillo 

Hermosillo
Education in Sonora
Irish Mexican
Private schools in Mexico
High schools in Mexico